Thomas-Sterry-Hunt International Ecological Reserve is an ecological reserve in Quebec, Canada. It was established on September 7, 1988. 

The ecological reserve was named in honour of Thomas Sterry Hunt, F.R.S., an American geologist, who served as chief assistant to Sir William Edmond Logan, the director of the Canadian Geological Survey.

The reserve lies on the border with the Seboomook Lake territory of extreme northern Somerset County, Maine.

References

External links
 Official website from Government of Québec

Protected areas of Chaudière-Appalaches
Nature reserves in Quebec
Protected areas established in 1988
1988 establishments in Quebec